Phyllonorycter farensis is a moth of the family Gracillariidae. It is known from the Faro River Reserve in Cameroon and the southern part of the Democratic Republic of the Congo.

The length of the forewings is about 2.7 mm for males and about 3.2 mm for females. Adults are on wing in late November.

Etymology
The name of this species is formed from the root of the type locality "Far–o", and the Latin suffix -ensis, denoting place.

References

Moths described in 2007
farensis
Insects of Cameroon
Insects of the Democratic Republic of the Congo
Moths of Africa